"One, Two, Three" is a 1998 song by British singer Dina Carroll. It was co-written by Carroll and produced by American record producer and songwriter Rhett Lawrence. Originally it was planned to be included on Carroll's third album, Dina Carroll, but the album was ultimately shelved. The single peaked at number 16 in the UK and number 23 in Scotland. A music video was also produced to promote the single.

Track listing

Charts

References

 

Dina Carroll songs
1998 singles
1998 songs
Mercury Records singles
First Avenue Records singles
Songs written by Steve Robson
Song recordings produced by Rhett Lawrence